John Bond Pearce (bapt. 25 January 1843 – 9 March 1903) was an English architect from Norwich, Norfolk. His architectural practice was in Surrey Street, Norwich. His son Neville Bond Pearce was also a noted architect. Pearce designed many of his building in the Victorian Gothic architectural style, a good example being the town hall in Great Yarmouth opened in 1882.

Works

This list is incomplete

Norfolk 

 The Royal Hotel (1840), 4 Marine Parade, Great Yarmouth.
 The Agricultural Hall (1882), renamed Anglia House, Prince of Wales Road, Norwich
 Great Yarmouth Town Hall (1882), Hall Quay, Great Yarmouth
 Manor Hotel (1900), Mundesley, Norfolk
 Alms Houses at East Bilney, Norfolk
 Catholic Chapel (1874) at Norwich Cemetery, Bowthorpe Road.
 Christ Church, Church Avenue, Norwich (1879)
 Buxton Parish Church, Norfolk, extensively restored (1881-2)

Gallery

References 

19th-century English architects
Architects from Norwich
1840s births
1903 deaths